Jack and Jacques is a Canadian short drama film, directed by Marie-Hélène Copti and released in 2006. The film stars Pierre Lebeau as Jacques Jobin, a mediocre actor from Quebec who has been cast in a small part as a Native American in a Western film starring Jack Nicholson, and is being interviewed by student filmmakers Pat Beauséjour (François Bernier) and Annie St-Gelais (Guillermina Kerwin) about his experiences on set and his hopes that the role will provide the career breakthrough that's always eluded him.

The film premiered at the 2006 Montreal World Film Festival, where it won the award for Most Popular Canadian Short Film. It received a Genie Award nomination for Best Live Action Short Drama at the 27th Genie Awards in 2007.

In 2011, Copti and Lebeau collaborated on the nine-episode web series Jack Jobin TV, which revisted the character pontificating on other topics.

References

External links
 

2006 films
2006 short films
Canadian drama short films
2006 drama films
French-language Canadian films
2000s Canadian films